is a 1984 animated movie that was adapted from a book of the same name. The plot is centered on the 1977 Yokohama F-4 crash.

Plot
Kaori lives next door to brothers Ko and Yasu. One day, as Kaori is walking home from school, an American plane crashes into the boy's neighbourhood.

Voice cast

Reception

References

External links
Official website

(English print media)
(Japanese print media) 

1984 films
1980s Japanese-language films
1984 anime films
Films based on Japanese novels
Japanese animated films